Leicester Lions are a rugby union club who currently play in National League 2 West – at tier 4 of the English rugby union system. The Lions are a leading amateur club in Leicester and along with Loughborough University and Hinckley are the senior clubs in Leicestershire after Premiership Rugby side Leicester Tigers. The club was formed as a result of an amalgamation between two local clubs in 1998, these being Westleigh RFC (established in 1904) and Wigston RFC (established in 1946).    

Leicester Lions boast several high-profile names amongst their former and current players and coaching staff. Jason Aldwinckle, the former Leicester Tigers' hooker is the forwards coach, while the former club captain and England Counties outside back Gareth Collins has taken over as head coach. Notable former Lions, Westleigh and Wigston players include England World Cup winning captain Martin Johnson, England lock Louis Deacon, Tigers back-rower Brett Deacon and Gloucester and England centre Billy Twelvetrees.

Current standings

Honours
Leicester Lions (1998–present)
 Leicestershire County Cup winners (3): 1999–00, 2000–01, 2003–04
 Midlands Division 1 champions: 2004–05

Westleigh (Parent club)

 Leicestershire County Cup winners (5): 1974–75, 1975–76, 1979–80, 1980–81, 1995–96

Wigston (Parent club)
 Leicestershire County Cup winners: 1973–74
 Leicestershire 1 champions: 1997–98

Notes

References

External links
 Official club website

English rugby union teams
Rugby clubs established in 1999
Sport in Leicester
Rugby union clubs in Leicestershire
Blaby
1999 establishments in England